Sing Hollies in Reverse is a tribute album of various artists performing songs by British rock group The Hollies. It was released on Eggbert Records in 1995.

According to AllMusic reviewer Roch Parisien, the 21 artists represented 1995's then-current "cream of contemporary power-pop," with contributions by The Posies, Steve Wynn, Tommy Keene, and The Loud Family. A review in The Riverfront Times cited the tribute for having "an eclecticism that the Hollies never did," praising some of the redone versions as "far superior to the originals."

Track listing
"King Midas In Reverse" – performed by The Posies
"Carrie Anne" – performed by Tommy Keene
"Look Through Any Window" – performed by The Loud Family
"The Air That I Breathe" – performed by Steve Wynn with Eric Ambel
"Pay You Back With Interest" – performed by Mitch Easter
"You Know He Did" – performed by Cub
"I'm Alive" – performed by Kristian Hoffman
"Water on the Brain" – performed by The Flamingoes
"Jennifer Eccles" – performed by E
"On a Carousel" – performed by The Jigsaw Seen
"Long Cool Woman (In a Black Dress)" – performed by John Easdale
"Step Inside" – performed by Bill Lloyd
"After the Fox" – performed by Loser's Lounge
"You Need Love" – performed by The Wondermints
"So Lonely" – performed by The Sneetches
"I Can't Let Go" – performed by Continental Drifters
"Touch" – performed by Carla Olson
"Heading for a Fall" – performed by Andrew Sandoval
"Bus Stop" – performed by Material Issue
"Dear Eloise" – performed by Shakin' Apostles
"Sorry Suzanne" – performed by Jon Brion

References

External links
  at Eggbert Records
 
 

1995 compilation albums
Tribute albums
The Hollies